Recovered: Journeys Through the Autism Spectrum and Back is a 2008 documentary about four children which claims each completely "recovered" from the autism spectrum. The film is directed by Michele Jaquis and produced by Doreen Granpeesheh and the Center for Autism and Related Disorders. Recovered premiered on April 25, 2008 at the Pacific Design Center's SilverScreen Theater.

Synopsis
Recovered: Journeys Through the Autism Spectrum and Back covers four children who the Autism Society says recovered from autism, despite the fact that autism is a lifelong neurodevelopmental disorder which has no cure. Each child received services from the Center for Autism and Related Disorders Inc. (CARD), including assessments, supervision, parent/teacher training and one-on-one behavioral therapy. The film presents documentation of therapy sessions along with interviews of the children who are now teenagers, their parents, therapists and the founder/executive director of CARD.

Distribution
Recovered was self-distributed through its website.

Reception
Recovered won Best Documentary in the 2008 Director's Chair Film Festival in Staten Island, NY.

References

Further reading
 Mikailian, Arin. (May 1–7, 2008) Los Angeles Independent, West Hollywood Edition ''" p. 1, 4 
 Miller, Sam (September 28th, 2008) OC Register ""

External links
Official website
 
 Recovered trailer and premiere highlights on YouTube
 Recovered: Journeys Through the Autism Spectrum and Back on Amazon

2008 films
American documentary films
American independent films
Documentary films about autism
Documentary films about children with disability
2008 documentary films
2000s English-language films
2000s American films
2008 independent films